Lubin is a city in Lower Silesian Voivodeship, south-west Poland.

Lubin may also refer to:

People
 Lubin (surname)

Places

Poland 
Lubin County in Lower Silesian Voivodeship (south-west Poland)
Lubin, Kuyavian-Pomeranian Voivodeship (north-central Poland)
Lubin, Lubusz Voivodeship (west Poland)
Lubin, Warmian-Masurian Voivodeship (north Poland)
Lubin, Gryfice County in West Pomeranian Voivodeship (north-west Poland)
Lubin, Kamień County in West Pomeranian Voivodeship (north-west Poland)
Lubiń, Gniezno County in Greater Poland Voivodeship (west-central Poland)
Lubiń, Kościan County in Greater Poland Voivodeship (west-central Poland)
Łubin Kościelny in Podlaskie Voivodeship (north-eastern Poland)
Łubin Rudołty in Podlaskie Voivodeship (north-eastern Poland)

Germany 
 Lübben (Spreewald) (Sorbian and Polish Lubin) in Lower Lusatia (eastern Germany)

Companies
Lubin Manufacturing Company, motion picture company founded by Siegmund Lubin

See also 
 Lu Bin (disambiguation)